Bankers Trust Building can refer to one of several New York City skyscrapers owned by the Bankers Trust, a financial institution acquired by Deutsche Bank in 1998:

 14 Wall Street – the original, extant Bankers Trust Building erected in 1912 and expanded in 1933
 The Deutsche Bank Building, originally The Bankers Trust building located at 130 Liberty Street, erected in 1974 and heavily damaged in the September 11 attacks, which has since been deconstructed.
 280 Park Avenue – designed by Henry Dreyfuss and completed in 1963